Moksha Recordings is an English electronic music record company. They mainly release alternative electronic music, an example of this would be S.O.L Arranguez (1996), which uses the classical guitar and vocals from Concierto de Aranjuez mixed with modern house music. They have also released music for big bands like The Shamen and Kosheen. The record company was founded in 1986 by Charles Cosh and is still going today.

External links
 Website 
 Discogs

British record labels
Electronic music record labels
Record labels established in 1986
1986 establishments in England